The Men's 800 metre freestyle competition of the 2022 European Aquatics Championships was held on 12 and 13 August 2022.

Records
Prior to the competition, the existing world, European and championship records were as follows.

The following new records were set during this competition.

Results

Heats
The heats were started on 12 August at 10:08.

Final
The final was held on 13 August at 19:37.

References

Men's 800 metre freestyle